Wilbur Scott "Jake" Striker (October 23, 1933 – March 7, 2013) was a left-handed pitcher in Major League Baseball who played in  and  with the Cleveland Indians and Chicago White Sox.

In his MLB debut on September 25, against the Kansas City Athletics at the age of 25, Striker tossed 6⅔ innings of solid baseball, allowing only two earned runs for a 2.70 earned run average and the win. He went 0 for 1 with a walk at the plate in what would be the only game in which he would appear in 1959.

The only player from Heidelberg College to reach the major leagues, Striker was traded on December 6,  with Dick Brown, Don Ferrarese and Minnie Miñoso to the White Sox for Johnny Romano, Bubba Phillips and Norm Cash. He only appeared in two games with the White Sox, both relief appearances. In 3+ innings of work, he posted a 4.91 ERA, striking out one and walking one. His major league career ended on April 24, . Overall, he went 1 and 0 with a 3.48 ERA in 3 games in his career. He walked five, struck out six and gave up one home run (to Casey Wise) in about 10 innings of work. Overall, he wore three uniform numbers in his short two-year career. He wore 23 with the Indians, and 20 and 31 with the White Sox.

External links

1933 births
2013 deaths
Baseball players from Ohio
Chattanooga Lookouts players
Chicago White Sox players
Cleveland Indians players
Green Bay Bluejays players
Heidelberg Student Princes baseball players
Indianapolis Indians players
Knoxville Smokies players
Louisville Colonels (minor league) players
Major League Baseball pitchers
Minneapolis Millers (baseball) players
Mobile Bears players
People from Crawford County, Ohio
Peoria Chiefs players
Reading Indians players
San Diego Padres (minor league) players